Lake Lenore is a village in the Canadian province of Saskatchewan within the Rural Municipality of Lake Lenore No. 399 and Census Division No. 15. The village is located 144.6 km northeast of the City of Saskatoon. Outside the village is a lake that shares its name, Lake Lenore, renowned for its fishing activity, as well the Rural Municipality of Lake Lenore No. 399 to the north. Lake Lenore possesses a fully operational school, Co-op Grocery and Agro Service Station and also contains a Credit Union and Public Library.

History 
The first home built in Lake Lenore was built by Bernard Gerwing and he is considered a founder of the community. Later on the community would shift a half a kilometre to be closer to the railroad. Bernard Gerwing's home would become abandoned in 1916-1917, it was made into a historical site by the community and is preserved to this day.  Lake Lenore incorporated as a village on April 28, 1921. Lake Lenore was previously known as Lenore Lake before the name was changed in the 1920s due to a mistake made in the books of the railway company. Lake Lenore is a primarily German community.

Demographics 

See also 
 List of communities in Saskatchewan
 Villages of Saskatchewan

References

External links
Municipal Directory Saskatchewan - Village of Lake Lenore
Saskatchewan City & Town Maps
Saskatchewan Gen Web - One Room School Project 
Post Offices and Postmasters - ArchiviaNet - Library and Archives Canada
Saskatchewan Gen Web Region
Online Historical Map Digitization Project
GeoNames Query 
2006 Community Profiles

Villages in Saskatchewan
Lake Lenore No. 399, Saskatchewan
Division No. 15, Saskatchewan